Occupation of Lebanon may refer to:

 Israeli occupation of Southern Lebanon (1985–2000)
 Syrian occupation of Lebanon (1976–2005)